Polyphia is a primarily instrumental progressive rock band based in Plano, Texas, formed in 2010. The group consists of guitarists Tim Henson and Scott LePage, bassist Clay Gober, and drummer Clay Aeschliman. 

Polyphia's sound is noted for incorporating virtuosic guitar parts with other styles of music. Initially rooted in a metal-focused tone in their early releases, the band's music evolved to a more progressive rock sound in their later productions, combining electronic music and hip hop. Polyphia has released four studio albums, two EPs, and numerous singles. Their fourth album, Remember That You Will Die, released in October 2022, was the first to chart, debuting at number 33 on the Billboard 200.

History
Polyphia first achieved mainstream success after the guitar play-through of "Impassion", from their EP Inspire, went viral on YouTube. Since then, the band's popularity has grown and they have shared the stage with progressive metalcore artists such as Periphery, Between the Buried and Me, and August Burns Red.

The band has stated their influences come from artists of all genres. The group started out with a heavier shred-oriented style but has since created a more melodic-focused sound. When describing the album Muse, guitarist Tim Henson says that the primary inspiration came from pop and rap music.

In a 2013 interview, when asked about the name of the band, the following answer was given:

It comes from the word "Polyphony", meaning "music whose texture is defined by the interweaving of several melodic lines". Playing off this definition, as a band, we capitalize on musicianship and that, musically, each member of the band is a cornerstone of our sound. We stray from the idea of a one-dimensional, vocal-centered, or guitar-centered, or drum-centered group, and let each member of the band play an integral part in the overall product. As a people, all of us have a unique and personal identity that makes us dynamic and purposeful, and our band means to convey this quality within all of us through our music; never diminishing the potential of others and thriving in unity.

In September 2022, Polyphia released the single "Ego Death", the fourth from their latest album, Remember That You Will Die. The release was accompanied by a video, both of which feature guitar virtuoso Steve Vai. Remember That You Will Die was released on October 28, 2022, and includes guest appearances by Sophia Black, Brasstracks, Snot, Chino Moreno and the aforementioned Vai. The band have announced a 15-date European tour to support it.

Style and influences
Polyphia was originally known for classical guitar covers on YouTube. Their first EP, Inspire, and first LP, Muse employ more progressive metal influences than their later releases. This associated them with the djent movement, although they were characteristically less heavy and more melody-based than their peers. Their second studio album, Renaissance, saw the band diverge further away from metal, into a more progressive rock and math rock-influenced sound. They also began to mix elements of EDM, funk, and hip hop, with the single "LIT", a remix of the song "Light", the second track on Renaissance. This sound was further developed with the release of their second EP, The Most Hated, and third LP, New Levels New Devils, which featured production from hip hop and EDM producers Judge and Y2K. The band's fourth studio album, Remember That You Will Die, has continued in this vein, further exploring "trap percussion and hip hop stylings", as well as incorporating a variety of genres, such as bubblegum pop and bossa nova.

Gear
Tim Henson is an Ibanez-endorsed artist with three signature guitars, the THBB10, TOD10N, and TOD10. The THBB10 has a roasted maple neck, a Gotoh tremolo bridge with locking machine heads, as well as DiMarzio pickups. The TOD10N is a nylon-string electric guitar, with a unique "Tree of Death" inlay conceived by Henson. The TOD10 (not to be confused with the TOD10N) is a solid-body guitar. It has a roasted maple neck with the "Tree of Death" inlay first seen on the TOD10N, Gotoh tremolo bridge and locking machine heads, and a set of Fishman Fluence Tim Henson Signature humbucker pickups. Additionally, Henson has worked with Neural-DSP to release the "Archetype: Tim Henson" plugin, which contains three simulated amps and Henson's signature "Multivoicer" attachment. Scott LePage also has two Ibanez signature guitars, the SLM10 and the KRYS10. The SLM10 has a roasted maple neck, a Gotoh tremolo bridge with locking machine heads, and DiMarzio pickups. The KRYS10 also has a roasted maple neck, Gotoh tremolo bridge with locking machine heads, and a set of Fishman Fluence Scott LePage Signature humbucking pickups. Clay Aeschliman is endorsed by TAMA Drums and frequently uses Meinl cymbals. Clay Gober uses Ibanez bass guitars, most notably basses in the Ibanez SR series.

Band members
Current
 Tim Henson – guitar (2010–present)
 Scott LePage – guitar (2010–present)
 Clay Gober – bass guitar (2012–present)
 Clay Aeschliman – drums (2016–present)

Past
 Brandon Burkhalter – drums (2010–2014; 2015–2016), clean vocals (2010–2011)
 Randy Methe – drums (2014–2015)
 Lane Duskin – vocals (2010–2012)

Discography

Studio albums

EPs

Singles

References

External links
 

Musical groups established in 2010
American progressive rock groups
Musical groups from Dallas
2010 establishments in Texas
Equal Vision Records artists